Tom, Thomas or Tommy Johnston may refer to:

Thomas Johnston (engraver) (1708–1767), American engraver and organ builder
Thomas A. Johnston (1848–1934), American educator
Thomas Alan Johnston, Scottish engineer
Thomas Brumby Johnston (1814–1897), Scottish cartographer
Thomas D. Johnston (1840–1902), U.S. Representative from North Carolina
Thomas E. Johnston (born 1967), US federal judge
Thomas George Johnston (1849–1905), Canadian physician and political figure
Thomas Henry Johnston (1880–?), New Zealand tram conductor, labourer, miner and strike-breaker
Thomas Johnston (Canadian politician) (1821–1903), Canadian industrial and political figure
Thomas L. Johnston (1927–2009), Scottish scientist
Thomas Nicol Johnston (1870–1923), Scottish zoologist
Thomas Harvey Johnston (1881–1951), Australian biologist and parasitologist
Thomas Henry Johnston (British Army officer) (died 1891)
Thomas W. "T. J." Johnston Jr. (born 1956), American lawyer and Anglican bishop
Tom Johnston (footballer) (1918–1994), Scottish midfielder; playing career 1938–1956; coaching and managerial career 1956–1978
Thomas Jack (Tom Jack Johnston, born 1993), Australian DJ and musician; pioneer of the "tropical house" subgenre
Tom Johnston (musician) (born 1948), American musician, co-founder of The Doobie Brothers
Tom Johnston (Saskatchewan politician) (1881–1969), British-born Canadian political figure
Tom Johnston (British politician) (1881–1965), Scottish political figure
Tom Johnston (greyhound trainer) (1933–2001), British greyhound trainer
Tommy Johnston (1927–2008), Scottish footballer

See also
Thomas Lipton (1848–1931), Scottish merchant and personality; created Lipton tea brand; also known as Sir Thomas Johnstone Lipton
Thomas Johnson (disambiguation)